Class L: Education is a classification used by the Library of Congress Classification system. This page outlines the sub-classes of Class L.

L - Education (General) 

7-97...........................................Periodicals. Societies
101............................................Yearbooks
107............................................Congresses
111-791.....................................Official documents, reports, etc.
797-898.....................................Educational exhibitions and museums
899............................................School fairs
900-991.....................................Directories of educational institutions

LA - History of Education 

5-25.........................................General
31-135.....................................By period
173-186...................................Higher education
201-398...................................United States
410-2284.................................Other regions or countries
2301-2396................................Biography

LB - Theory and practice of education 

5-45.........................................General
51-885.....................................Systems of individual educators and writers
1025-1050.75...........................Teaching (Principles and practice)
1049.9-1050.75..............................Reading (General)
1050.9-1091.............................Educational psychology
1101-1139................................Child study
1139.2-1139.5..........................Early childhood education
1140-1140.5.............................Preschool education...Nursery schools
1141-1489................................Kindergarten
1501-1547................................Primary education
1555-1602................................Elementary or public school education
1603-1696.6.............................Secondary education. High schools
1705-2286................................Education and training of teachers and administrators
1771-1773......................................Certification of teachers
1775-1785......................................Professional aspects of teaching and school administrators. Vocational guidance
1805-2151......................................State teachers colleges
1811-1987............................................United States
1991-2151............................................Other regions or countries
2165-2278......................................Teacher training in universities and colleges
2300-2430................................Higher education
2326.4-2330...................................Institutions of higher education
2331.7-2335.8................................Teaching personnel
2335.86-2335.885..........................Trade unions
2335.95-2337.................................Endowments, trusts, etc.
2337.2-2340.8................................Student financial aid
2341-2341.95.................................Supervision and administration. Business management
2351-2359......................................Admissions and entrance requirements
2361-2365......................................Curriculum
2366-2367.75.................................College examinations
2371-2372......................................Graduate education
2381-2391......................................Academic degrees
2799-2799.3.............................Educational consultants and consulting
2801-3095................................School administration and organization
2831.6-2831.99..............................Administrative personnel
2832-2844.1...................................Teaching personnel
2844.52-2844.63............................Trade unions
3011-3095......................................School management and discipline
3045-3048............................................Textbooks
3050-3060.87.......................................Educational tests, measurements, evaluations and examinations
3201-3325................................School architecture and equipment. School physical facilities. Campus planning
3401-3495................................School hygiene. School health services
3497-3499................................Hygiene in universities and colleges
3525-3575................................Special days
3602-3640................................School life. Student manners and customs

LC - Special aspects of education 

8-59.........................................Forms of education
8...................................................General works
15..................................................Conversation and culture
25-33.............................................Self-education. Self-culture
37-44.3..........................................Home Education
45-45.8..........................................Nonformal education
47-58.7..........................................Private school education
58-58.7................................................Preparatory schools. Preparatory school education
59..................................................Public school education
65-245.....................................Social aspects of education
65-67.68........................................Economic aspects of education
68-70.............................................Demographic aspects of education
71-120.4........................................Education and the state
72-72.5................................................Academic freedom
107-120.4............................................Public school question. Secularization. Religious instruction in the public schools
129-139.........................................Compulsory education
142-148.5......................................Attendance. Dropouts
149-161.........................................Literacy. Illiteracy
165-182.........................................Higher education and the state
184-188.........................................Taxation of schools and colleges
189-214.53....................................Educational sociology
212-212.863.........................................Discrimination in education
212.9-212.93.......................................Sex differences in education
213-214.53..........................................Educational equalization. Right to education
215-238.4......................................Community and the school
223......................................................Schools as community centers
225-226.7............................................Home and school
230-235...............................................Parent-teacher associations. Home and school associations
237-238.4............................................College-university and the community
241-245.........................................Foundations, endowments, funds
251-951...................................Moral and religious education
251-318.........................................Moral education. Character building
321-951.........................................Religion and education. Education under church control
361-629...............................................Christian education. Church education
446-454.....................................................Orthodox Eastern Church
461-510.....................................................Roman Catholic
531-629.....................................................Protestant
701-775...............................................Jewish education
901-915...............................................Islamic education
921-929.7............................................Buddhist education
951......................................................Other
980-1099.5..............................Types of education
1001-1024......................................Humanistic education. Liberal education
1022-1022.25.......................................Computer-assisted education
1025-1027......................................Collective education
1030..............................................Communist education
1031-1034.5...................................Competency based education
1035-1035.8...................................Basic education. Basic skills education
1036-1036.8...................................Community education
1037-1037.8...................................Career education
1041-1048......................................Vocational education (General)
1049-1049.8...................................Cooperative education
1051-1072......................................Professional education
1081-1087.4...................................Industrial education (General)
1090-1091......................................Political education
1099-1099.5...................................Multicultural education (General)
1200-1203................................Inclusive education
1390-5160.3.............................Education of special classes of persons
1390..............................................Men. Boys
1401-2572......................................Women. Girls
2574-2576......................................Gays. Lesbians. Bisexuals
2580-2582......................................Student-athletes
2601-2611......................................Education in developing countries
2630-2638......................................Asian Americans. Asians in the United States
2667-2698......................................Latin Americans. Hispanic Americans
2680-2688............................................Mexican Americans. Mexicans in the United States
2690-2698............................................Puerto Ricans. Puerto Ricans in the United States
2699-2913......................................Blacks. African Americans
3001-3501......................................Asians
3503-3520......................................Romanies. Gypsies
3530-3540......................................Lapps
3551-3593......................................Jews
3701-3740......................................Immigrants or ethnic and linguistic minorities. Bilingual schools and bilingual education
3745-3747......................................Children of immigrants (First generation)
3950-4806.5...................................Exceptional children and youth. Special education
3991-4000............................................Gifted children and youth
4001-4806.5.........................................Children and youth with disabilities. Learning disabled children and youth
4812-5160.3...................................Other special classes
5161-5163................................Fundamental education
5201-6660.4.............................Education extension. Adult education. Continuing education
5451-5493......................................Aged education
5501-5560......................................Evening schools
5701-5771......................................Vacation schools. Summer schools
5800-5808......................................Distance education
5900-6101......................................Correspondence schools
6201-6401......................................University extension
6501-6560.4...................................Lyceums and lecture courses. Forums
6571-6581......................................Radio and television extension courses. Instruction by radio and television
6601-6660.4...................................Reading circles and correspondence clubs
6681........................................Education and travel
6691........................................Traveling educational exhibits

LD - Individual institutions - United States 

13-7501...................................United States
13-7251.........................................Universities in US. Colleges
6501....................................................Community colleges. Junior colleges
7020-7251............................................Women's colleges
7501..............................................Secondary and elementary schools

LE - Individual institutions - America (except United States) 

3-78.........................................America (except United States)
3-5.................................................Canada
7-9.................................................Mexico
11-13.............................................Central America
15-17.............................................West Indies
21-78.............................................South America
21-23...................................................Argentina
27-29...................................................Bolivia
31-33...................................................Brazil
36-38...................................................Chile
41-43...................................................Colombia
46-48...................................................Ecuador
51-59...................................................Guianas
61-63...................................................Paraguay
66-68...................................................Peru
71-73...................................................Uruguay
76-78...................................................Venezuela

LF - Individual institutions - Europe 

14-1257...................................Great Britain
14-797...........................................England
800-957.........................................Ireland
960-1137........................................Scotland
1140-1257......................................Wales
(1311)-1537.............................Austria
1541-1549................................Czech Republic
1550-1550.8.............................Slovakia
1561-1697................................Hungary
1705-1709................................Finland
1711-2397................................France
2402-3197................................Germany
3211-3247................................Greece
3248-3897................................Italy
3899........................................Malta
3911-4067................................Belgium
4069........................................Luxembourg
4071-4197................................Netherlands
4203-4209................................Poland
(4211)-4437.............................Russia (Federation)
4440-4441................................Estonia
4443-4444................................Latvia
4445-4446................................Lithuania
4447.2-4447.5..........................Belarus
4448-4448.5.............................Moldova
4449.2-4449.5..........................Ukraine
4451-4487................................Denmark
4488-4488.2.............................Faroe Islands
4489-4491................................Iceland
4493-4537................................Norway
4539-4607................................Sweden
4610-4827................................Spain
4831-4887................................Portugal
4901-5047................................Switzerland
5051-5627................................Turkey and the Baltic states

LG - Individual institutions - Asia, Africa, Indian Ocean islands, Australia, New Zealand, Pacific Islands 

21-395.....................................Asia
21.................................................Afghanistan
51-53............................................China
55-57............................................Taiwan
60-170.2........................................India...Pakistan..Bangladesh...Burma...Sri Lanka..Nepal
171-172.........................................Indochina
173...............................................Malaysia
181-184.........................................Indonesia
185-187.........................................Papua-New Guinea (Ter.)
200-227.........................................Philippines
240-277.........................................Japan
281-285.........................................Korea
291...............................................Iran
302.2-320......................................Former Soviet republics in Asia
321...............................................Asia Minor
331-331.5......................................Armenia (Republic)
332.2-332.5...................................Azerbaijan
332.7-332.9...................................Georgia (Republic)
333...............................................Bahrain
338...............................................Iraq
341-345.........................................Israel...Palestine
346...............................................Jordan
347...............................................Kuwait
351-357.........................................Lebanon
358...............................................Qatar
359...............................................Saudi Arabia
361-367.........................................Syria
370...............................................Yeman (Yemen Arab Republic)
395...............................................Other
401-681...................................Africa
401...............................................Ethiopia
405-411.........................................South Africa
416...............................................Botswana
418...............................................Kenya
419...............................................Lesotho
421-423.........................................Uganda
431-438.........................................Natal
441-443.........................................Malawi
451...............................................Orange Free State
454...............................................Swaziland
457...............................................Transkei
459...............................................Venda
461-462.........................................Zimbabwe
468...............................................Tanzania
469...............................................Zambia
471-475.........................................Transvaal
478...............................................Zululand
481-505.........................................West Africa
481-483...............................................Nigeria
497-499...............................................Ghana
511...............................................Egypt
513-514.........................................Sudan
521...............................................Algeria and Tunisia
525...............................................Burundi
531-536.........................................French Equatorial Africa. French Congo
541-543.........................................Madagascar
545-547.........................................Rwanda
551-552.........................................Senegal
553-554.........................................Benin
559-560.........................................Ivory Coast
561...............................................Mali
581-593.........................................German Africa (Former)
601-611.........................................Italian Africa (Former)
615...............................................Zaire
621...............................................Liberia
631-632.........................................Morocco
641-651.........................................Portuguese Africa (Former)
671...............................................Spanish Africa
681...............................................Libya
690.........................................Indian Ocean islands
715-720...................................Australia
741-745...................................New Zealand
961.........................................Pacific islands

LH - College and school magazines and papers 
1-9....................................College and school magazines and papers

LJ - Student fraternities and societies, United States 
3-165.................................Student fraternities and societies, United States

LT - Textbooks 
6-(1001).............................Textbooks. Class here textbooks covering several subjects. For textbooks on particular subjects, see the subject in Classes B-Z

References

Further reading 
 Full schedule of all LCC Classifications
 List of all LCC Classification Outlines

Library of Congress Classification